Christmas dinner is a meal traditionally eaten at Christmas. This meal can take place any time from the evening of Christmas Eve to the evening of Christmas Day itself. The meals are often particularly rich and substantial, in the tradition of the Christian feast day celebration, and form a significant part of gatherings held to celebrate the arrival of Christmastide. In many cases, there is a ritual element to the meal related to the religious celebration, such as the saying of grace.

The actual meal consumed varies in different parts of the world with regional cuisines and local traditions. In many parts of the world, particularly former British colonies, the meal shares some connection with the English Christmas dinner involving roasted meats and pudding of some description. The Christmas pudding and Christmas cake evolved from this tradition.

In countries without a lengthy Christian tradition, the Christmas meal may be more heavily influenced by popular culture. An example of this is Japan, where a KFC takeaway meal is traditionally consumed.

Asia

India
Indian people cook a variety of foods, including biryani with chicken or mutton, chicken and mutton curry, followed by cake or sweets like kheer. Long established Christian communities such as Goan Catholics have pork dishes and beef dishes as part of their main course of their Christmas dinner. These include pork vindaloo and sorpatel. For dessert, a dish called bebinca is popular.
The Kerala Christian community is the largest Christianity community in India. Keralites celebrate Christmas with midnight mass, Christmas carols and food. The Christmas celebration begins on Christmas Eve. Churches are decorated, Christmas trees and bigger Christmas stars from youth groups are the biggest attractions in Kerala. Pork Vindaloo, Beef Stew, and Mappas are the common dishes served during Christmas dinner. Keralites people go from home to home to celebrate and dance during carol time. All Keralites—including Hindus and Muslims—celebrate Christmas and share sweets and gifts and participate in carols and town celebrations. Plum cake is a famous dessert in Kerala and family come together and cut the cake after the midnight mass, the cutting of plum cakes after Christmas mass is treated as a tradition in Kerala. Occasionally, wines commonly made from grapes as well as pineapples, gooseberries or other fruit, are consumed.

Japan

Japanese Christmas cake, a white sponge cake covered with cream and decorated with strawberries, is often consumed, and Stollen cake, made locally, is widely available. A successful advertising campaign in the 1970s made eating at KFC around Christmas a national custom. Its chicken meals are so popular during the season that stores take reservations months in advance.

Lebanon
Lebanese Christians celebrate Christmas dinners. The feast, usually on the night of the 24th and lunch on the 25th, is a big one. The family gets together at both meals, and some have the leftovers from the dinner prior to the lunch the next day. The traditional offering for Christmas is sugar-coated almonds.  Roast turkey is the most common choice of meal. Roasted duck, Lebanese salad (Tabbouleh) and pastries such as honey cake are common. Beirut celebrates Christmas by conducting glamorous and big Christmas parties. Western-style poinsettias, community Christmas trees, and Christmas lights are very popular.

Philippines
Christmas dinner in the Philippines is called Noche Buena following Hispanic custom, and is held towards midnight of 24 December. This usually comes after the entire family has attended the late evening Mass called the Misa de Gallo ("Mass of the Rooster"). The centerpiece of the Noche Buena is often the hamón, which is usually a cured leg of pork. This is usually served with queso de bola, literally a ball of edam cheese covered in red wax. Other ubiquitous dishes are pasta and, for dessert, fruit salad. The dinner would usually be accompanied by tsokolate or hot cocoa, made with pure, locally grown cacao beans. Some families prefer tsokolate prepared from tablea or pressed cocoa powder tablets that are either pure or slightly sweetened. Most of the foods served on Noche Buena are fresh and usually prepared the day of Christmas Eve.

Middle-class and affluent families tend to prepare sumptuous feasts which may include any of the following: lechón or spit-roasted pig; lumpia; escabeche; adobo; rellenong manok or stuffed chicken; roast turkey; mechado (beef stew); kaldereta (spicy beef stew); paella; and other traditional fiesta dishes. Less well-off families would opt for a more economical Noche Buena; the organising of even a simple gathering despite financial difficulties reflects the paramount importance in Filipino culture of familial (and, by extension, communal) unity.

This focus on the family is common to all Filipino socio-economic classes and ethnic groups that observe Christmas. Most – if not all – members from the branches or extended families in a clan are expected to partake of the Noche Buena. Relatives living abroad, especially OFWs, are highly encouraged to return home for the occasion, as it is the most important Filipino Christian holiday of the year. Most families prefer to exchange Christmas presents right after dinner, contrary to the Western custom of opening presents on Christmas morning.

Europe

Austria
In Austria, Christmas Eve is the celebration of the end of the pre-Christmas fast. Christmas is usually celebrated only by Christians. Christmas Eve is historically the day that the tree is decorated and lit with real candles, so that the Christkindl may visit. Christmas Day is a national holiday in Austria and most Austrians spend the day feasting with their family. Fried carp, Sachertorte, and Christmas biscuits (Lebkuchen and Weihnachtssterne) are eaten, as are many other chocolate delicacies including edible Christmas ornaments. Christmas dinner is usually goose, ham served with Gluhwein, Rumpunsch, and chocolate mousse.

Czech Republic
A traditional Christmas meal in the Czech Republic is fried carp and potato salad which are eaten during Christmas dinner on the evening of 24 December. It is often accompanied by a fish soup prepared from carp leftovers (head or bones) or a traditional Czech mushroom dish Kuba. Many households also prepare a great variety of unique Christmas biscuits to offer to visitors. These are prepared many days before the feast and take a long time to decorate. It is also common to hang for children wrapped chocolate sweets on the Christmas tree as decoration.

Denmark

In Denmark, the traditional Christmas meal served on 24 December consists, according to one representative study, of duck (66% of households surveyed), roast pork with crackling (43%), turkey (8%), or goose (7%). The figures total more than 100% because it was found that some families prepare more than one kind of meat for Christmas dinner.  The meat is served with boiled potatoes (some of which are caramelized, some roasted), red cabbage, and gravy. The main course is followed by a dessert of Risalamande, rice pudding served with cherry sauce or strawberry sauce, often with a whole almond hidden inside. The lucky finder of the almond is entitled to an extra present, the almond gift. Christmas drinks are Gløgg (mulled wine) and traditional Christmas beers, specially brewed for the season and which usually have a high alcohol content.

Finland

 (translated "Christmas table") is the name of the traditional food board served at Christmas in Finland, similar to the Swedish . It contains many different dishes, most of them typical for the season. The main dish is usually a large Christmas ham, which is eaten with mustard or bread along with the other dishes. The traditional Christmas beverage is mulled wine ( in Finnish), which may be either alcoholic or non-alcoholic.

Germany
In Germany, the primary Christmas dishes are roast goose and roast carp, although suckling pig, duck, or venison may also be served. Typical side dishes include roast potatoes and various forms of cabbage such as kale, Brussels sprouts, and red cabbage. In some regions, the Christmas dinner is traditionally served on Christmas Day rather than Christmas Eve. In this case, dinner on Christmas Eve is a simpler affair, consisting of sausages (such as Bockwurst or Wiener) and potato salad. Sweets and Christmas pastries are all but obligatory and include marzipan, gingerbread (Lebkuchen), several types of bread, and various fruitcakes and fruited loaves of bread such as Christstollen and Dresdener Stollen.

Portugal
Traditionally in Portugal the family gets together around the table on Christmas Eve to eat boiled dried-salted cod accompanied with boiled cabbage or greens varying with what they have in the garden leftover, boiled potatoes, boiled onions, boiled eggs, and chickpeas. Sometimes a simple dressing is made with onions, garlic, or parsley. This meal is accompanied by generous amounts of olive oil.

There are variations across the country and, traditionally, turkey and the famous portuguese bacalhau. A lot of reasons also have octopus (sometimes also pork in some regions) is served for lunch on the 25th.

Spain
In Spanish, Christmas Eve is called "Nochebuena," literally translated as "Good Night." In Spain, it is celebrated with a large family feast, which is eaten late in the evening and can last a couple of hours; some families attend midnight mass before or after the meal. In Spain, Christmas Eve is a time for celebrating in neighbourhood bars and cafes and around the table with family and friends. It is a time for gift exchanges or Santa Claus. However, it is mainly performed on Epiphany, which occurs on 6 January.

In medieval Catalan cuisine poultry was served for Christmas dinner, and other dishes with salsa de pago were followed by a course of lamb and bacon stew. The last course was formatge torrador (similar to provoleta in modern Argentinian cuisine), neula and clarea (also called "white sangria", similar to hippocras).

Sweden

The Swedish Christmas dinner or Julbord often consists of five or more courses. The first three courses are a variety of fish, usually different types of pickled herring and salmon, smoked salmon, eaten with boiled potatoes or crisp bread and lutfisk. The fourth is cold cuts of meat, with the Christmas ham being the most important. Smoked sausages, brawn, apple sauce, and leverpastej are also common. The fifth course consists of warm dishes such as meatballs, small fried sausages and Janssons frestelse. Finally, a cheese plate and dessert plate are served. The most popular dessert is rice pudding (risgrynsgröt) with a whole almond hidden inside. The finder of the almond is expected to get married before next Christmas. In some homes, the courses above are served like a buffet where all family members can pick and take the food in no dish order.

Common drinks are Christmas beer, julmust and snaps.

United Kingdom
Christmas dinner in the United Kingdom usually consists of roasted turkey, stuffing, gravy, pigs in blankets, bread sauce, redcurrant jelly, roast potatoes; vegetables (particularly Brussels sprouts, broccoli, carrots and parsnips) with dessert of Christmas pudding, mince pies (both served with brandy butter, custard or cream) or trifle. It is estimated that nine million turkeys are consumed at Christmas in the United Kingdom. This represents a halving of consumed turkeys in the past twenty five years as younger adults opt for alternatives.

In England throughout the 16th and 17th centuries, goose or capon was commonly served, and the rich sometimes dined upon peacock and swan.
The turkey appeared on Christmas tables in England in the 16th century. The 16th-century farmer Thomas Tusser noted that by 1573 turkeys were commonly served at English Christmas dinners. The tradition of turkey at Christmas rapidly spread throughout England in the 17th century, and it also became common to serve goose which remained the predominant roast until the Victorian era. (it was quite common for Goose "Clubs" to be set up, allowing working-class families to save up over the year towards a goose before this). A famous English Christmas dinner scene appears in Charles Dickens' A Christmas Carol (1843), where Scrooge sends Bob Cratchitt a large turkey. The pudding course of a British Christmas dinner may often be Christmas pudding, which dates from medieval England. Trifle, mince pies, Christmas cake or a yule log are also popular. By the 21st century, some British citizens were changing their Christmas dinner traditions with a growing number selecting vegetarian and vegan versions of traditional UK Christmas meals.

North America

Canada
In English-speaking Canada, Christmas dinner is similar to that of Britain. Traditional Christmas dinner features turkey with stuffing, mashed potatoes, gravy, cranberry sauce, and vegetables. Other types of poultry, roast beef, or ham, are also used. Pumpkin or apple pie, raisin pudding, Christmas pudding, or fruitcake are staples for dessert. Eggnog, a milk-based punch often infused with alcohol, is also popular around the holiday season. Other Christmas items include Christmas cookies, butter tarts, and shortbread, which are traditionally baked before the holidays and served to visiting friends at Christmas and New Year parties, as well as on Christmas Day.

In French-speaking Canada, traditions may be more like those of France. (See Réveillon.) Other ethnic communities may continue to use old-world traditions as well.

United States
Christmas traditions in the United States have eclectic origins, with predominant ones from the United Kingdom in most states. However, many others traditions are also celebrated, due to many years of influence from Europe (Spain, Scandinavia,  Italy, France, the Netherlands, Germany, etc.) as well as more recent influence from Latin American regions like Florida and the Caribbean.  Therefore, the substrate of the meal usually is British in origin: roasted root vegetables as a side dish, mashed potatoes, gravy, and the centerpiece being a stuffed roasted fowl (pheasant, goose, duck, or turkey) or an expensive cut of roasted beef or beef Wellington. In the South, an area that has a very high concentration of people of UK extraction from centuries past, Christmas is the time of year in which many variations on a country ham or Christmas ham get served. This is an older British tradition that would predate the Victorian tradition of Dickens and his turkey and go back into medieval England, brought by poorer classes who could not afford the turkey that was fashionable among wealthier men in the Stuart era.  Cookies of many kinds have been present in America for hundreds of years and often are either gingerbread, snickerdoodles, or sugar cookies baked throughout December and fashioned into many shapes and figures.

Fruitcake is similar to the traditional British Christmas pudding; however, it serves more as a national joke, often lampooned as an unwanted Christmas gift. The comic Johnny Carson once quipped, "The worst Christmas gift is fruitcake… There is only one fruitcake in the entire world, and people keep sending it to each other, year after year.". Many foreigners are skeptical of this fact, but indeed there is some truth to it: Manitou Springs, Colorado, holds an annual event in which unwanted fruitcakes are tossed in a contest to see who can throw the "gift" the farthest, with the locals building trebuchets and contraptions that are forbidden to have an electric motor. An elderly gentleman from Tecumseh, Michigan once made national news when he presented his countryman with the fact that he still had a fruitcake his great-grandmother baked in 1878, and thus was over 130 years old. As of 2018, the same fruitcake is believed to be still at large in the care of one of his grandchildren, proving Mr. Carson had a point.

Alcohol and cocktails (alcoholic and non-alcoholic) of all kinds are staples for both Christmas parties and family gatherings, where harder drinking is done amongst adults and youngsters usually get served soft drinks or a non-alcoholic version of what their parents drink, drinks like the Shirley Temple. A typical menu would include any combination of planter's punch, Kentucky bourbon and the cocktails that can be made from it, wines from California, Washington, Virginia, or New York of many varying vintages meant to complement the meal prepared by the host, Prosecco from Italy, hard cider from New England and California, wassail, Puerto Rican or Jamaican rum, champagne and other domestic sparkling white wines, and for individual cocktails the alcoholic version of eggnog, the poinsettia, and the Puerto Rican coquito, a cocktail composed of large amounts of coconut milk and rum.

In Florida and other Latin American regions in the Caribbean, including pockets of other east-coast U.S. cities, Spanish ancestry has a marked influence on the way Christmas is celebrated. Lechon, a spit-roasted piglet, is the mainstay of the meal, not turkey or ham. About one month earlier, turkey would have already been a centerpiece of the meal for Thanksgiving in some families. The crackling from the pig is a delicacy.

West of the Mississippi, Mexicans have had a great influence over the way the meal is prepared, including roasting corn in its husk and serving biscochitos.

Further regional meals offer diversity. Virginia has oysters, ham pie, and fluffy biscuits, a nod to its English 17th-century founders. The Upper Midwest includes dishes from predominantly Scandinavian backgrounds such as lutefisk and mashed rutabaga or turnip. In the southern US, rice is often served instead of potatoes, and on the Gulf Coast, shrimp and other seafood are usual appetizers, and Charlotte Russe chilled in a bed of Lady Fingers (called just Charlotte) is a traditional dessert, along with pumpkin and pecan pies. In some rural areas, game meats like elk or quail may grace the table, often prepared with old recipes: similar foodstuffs likely graced the tables of early American settlers on their first Christmases.

An Italian American meal for Christmas Eve can be the Feast of the Seven Fishes, Pannettone and struffoli are favored desserts in such cases.

It is a common tradition among many Jewish Americans to eat American Chinese food on Christmas because these are often the only establishments open on the holiday in many cities.

Oceania

Australia
Christmas dinner, although eaten at lunch time, in Australia is based on the traditional English versions. However, due to Christmas falling in the heat of the Southern Hemisphere's summer, meats such as ham, turkey and chicken are sometimes served cold with cranberry sauce, accompanied by side salads or roast vegetables. Barbecues are also a popular way of avoiding the heat of the oven. Seafood such as prawns, lobster, oysters and crayfish are common, as are barbecued cuts of steak or chicken breasts, drumsticks and wings. In summer, Australians are also fond of pavlova, a dessert composed of fruit such as strawberries, kiwifruit and passionfruit atop a baked meringue, with whipped cream. Trifle is also a favourite in Australia at Christmas time. Fresh fruits of the season include cherries and mangoes, plums, nectarine and peaches.
Introduced by Italian Australians, panettone is widely available in shops, particularly in Sydney and Melbourne.

South America

Brazil
In Brazil, the Christmas meal is quite a feast, (served in the evening on 24 December) offering large quantities of food, such as a wide variety of dishes which include roast turkey, fresh vegetables, luscious fruits and Brazil nuts. Accompanying these are bowls of colorful rice and platters filled with ham and fresh salad (sometimes cold potato salad is also served). Also, some parts of Brazil feature roast pork or chicken. Red wine, white wine, and apple cider are common alcoholic beverages. Other Christmas items include a variety of desserts such as lemon tart, nuts pie, chocolate cake and also Panettone.

Peru
On Christmas Eve (Noche Buena), the extended family join for a dinner of roast turkey and white rice seasoned with garlic. Roast potatoes and cooked sweetened apple puree are often served as well. The main dessert is panettone. It is usually accompanied by a cup of thick hot chocolate. Less common desserts include a special marzipan made out of Brazil nuts (due to the scarcity and expense of almonds in Peru) and assorted bowls with raisins and peanuts. At midnight, a toast is made, and good wishes and hugs are exchanged. A designated person runs to put Child Jesus in the Nativity scene. Then, the family members take their seats in the dining room while singing Christmas Carols.

See also
 List of dining events

References

External links
 

Christmas meals and feasts
Dinner